Julaika Nicoletti (born 20 March 1988) is an Italian female shot putter who won two national championships at individual senior level. She finished at 13th place in the 2015 indoor seasonal world lists in the shot put.

Biography
She competed in three editions of the European Athletics Championships (two outdoor and one indoor).

Achievements

National titles
Italian Athletics Indoor Championships
Shot put: 2010, 2012

See also
 Italian all-time lists - Shot put

References

External links
 

1988 births
Living people
Italian female shot putters
Athletics competitors of Gruppo Sportivo Forestale
Athletics competitors of Centro Sportivo Carabinieri
Sportspeople from Rimini
20th-century Italian women
21st-century Italian women